Benjamin Rush Cowen (August 15, 1831 – January 19, 1908) was Union Army general during the American Civil War and a Republican politician who was Ohio Secretary of State.

Benjamin Rush Cowen was born in Moorefield Township, Harrison County, Ohio. His father, Benjamin S. Cowen was later elected to Congress. He grew up in St. Clairsville, Belmont County, Ohio, where he attended a classical institute, and served an apprenticeship in printing at the Belmont Chronicle, where he became owner and editor at age 17. He completed studies in medicine, but never practiced.

On September 19, 1854, Cowen was married to Ellen Thoburn of Belmont County. She had eight children, three of whom survived him. In 1856, as an alternate, he attended the National Convention of the Republican Party in Philadelphia, which Nominated Fremont for the Presidency. He sold the Chronicle in 1858 and was in real estate in Bellaire. In the 54th General Assembly, he was Chief Clerk of the Ohio House of Representatives, and served during the 1860 and adjourned 1861 session. In October 1861 he was elected Ohio Secretary of State, but resigned for War duties in May 1862.

Civil War

Whitelaw Reid in Ohio in the War had this to say of Cowen's service: 

Although Cowen's brevet brigadier general appointment ranked from the omnibus date of March 13, 1865, President Andrew Johnson nominated Cowen for appointment to the grade of brevet brigadier general of volunteers on January 13, 1866, and the United States Senate confirmed the appointment on March 12, 1866.

Post war

In 1867, Cowen was a candidate for Governor at the Republican State Convention, but lost out to General Hayes. He was offered nomination as lieutenant-governor, but declined. In 1868, he was a delegate to the Republican National Convention. In 1869 he was appointed supervisor of revenue for California, Nevada, Utah, and Arizona, and transferred the following year to the southern district of Ohio. From 1871 to 1876 he was assistant secretary of the interior under President Grant. Grant gave Cowen a number of special assignments, and he is credited with helping to establish Yellowstone National Park.

From 1877 to 1882 Cowen engaged in business in Bellaire and Cincinnati. From 1882 to 1884 he was editor of the Ohio State Journal in Columbus. From 1884 to his death he was Clerk of the United States Circuit and District Courts for the Southern District of Ohio, and lived in Cincinnati.

Cowen became a member of the Literary Club of Cincinnati, and was a frequent public speaker on matters historical and patriotic. He died at Cincinnati January 29, 1908. He was buried at Greenwood Cemetery, Bellaire.

Publications

Notes

References

 Eicher, John H., and David J. Eicher, Civil War High Commands. Stanford: Stanford University Press, 2001. .

 

Secretaries of State of Ohio
Ohio Republicans
People from Harrison County, Ohio
19th-century American newspaper publishers (people)
People from St. Clairsville, Ohio
Politicians from Cincinnati
1908 deaths
1831 births
Union Army generals
People of Ohio in the American Civil War
Journalists from Ohio